List of Guggenheim Fellowships awarded in 1999.

U.S. and Canadian Fellows

 Chris Aiken, Choreographer and Dancer, Minneapolis; Teaching Specialist in Theatre Arts and Dance, University of Minnesota: Choreography.
 Jonathan Ames, Writer, New York City: Fiction.
 Barbara Watson Andaya, Professor of Asian Studies, University of Hawaii: A gendered history of early modern Southeast Asia.
 C. Edson Armi, Professor of History of Art, University of California, Santa Barbara: The first Romanesque architecture.
 Jon Robin Baitz, Playwright, New York City; Co-Director, Dramatic Writing Program, Juilliard School: Play writing.
 Peter Balakian, Professor of English, Colgate University: A family memoir.
 Lillian Ball, Artist, New York City: Visual art.
 Mary C. Beckerle, Professor of Biology, University of Utah: The molecular mechanism of cell movement.
 Robin Behn, Poet, Tuscaloosa, Alabama; Associate Professor of English, University of Alabama: Poetry.
 Andrea Belag, Artist, New York City; Instructor in Drawing, School of Visual Arts: Painting.
 David Beratan, Professor of Chemistry, University of Pittsburgh: Energy transduction schemes in biology.
 Janet Catherine Berlo, Susan B. Anthony Professor of Gender and Women's Studies and Professor of Art History, University of Rochester: Graphic arts of the 19th-century Plains Indians.
 Derek Bermel, Composer, Brooklyn, New York: Music composition.
 Ben S. Bernanke, Howard Harrison and Gabrielle Snyder Beck Professor of Economics and Public Affairs, Princeton University: Economic policy and the Great Depression.
 David Biale, Koret Professor of Jewish History and Director, Richard S. Dinner Center for Jewish Studies, Graduate Theological Union, Berkeley, California: Blood as a symbol and a substance in Western culture.
 Roger Bilham, Professor of Geological Sciences and Associate Director, Cooperative Institute for Research in the Environmental Sciences(CIRES), University of Colorado, Boulder: Global urbanization and seismic risk.
 Sheila S. Blair, Independent Scholar, Richmond, New Hampshire: A survey of Islamic calligraphy.
 Caroline H. Bledsoe, Professor of Anthropology, Northwestern University: Body contingency and linearity in the history of Western obstetrics.
 Andrea Blum, Artist, New York City; Associate Professor of Art, Hunter College, City University of New York: Sculpture and public art.
 David Bottoms, Poet, Marietta, Georgia; Professor of English, Georgia State University: Poetry.
 Rogers Brubaker, Professor of Sociology, University of California, Los Angeles: Ethnicity and nationalism in a Transylvanian town.
 Stephen G. Brush, Distinguished University Professor of the History of Science, University of Maryland, College Park: A comparative study of theory evaluation in different sciences.
 Steven M. Burke, Composer, Hopewell Junction, New York: Music composition.
 Jacqueline Carey, Writer, Missoula, Montana: Fiction.
 Susan Carey, Professor of Psychology, New York University: The origin of concepts.
 George Chaconas, Professor of Biochemistry and MRC Distinguished Scientist, University of Western Ontario: Molecular biological studies of the Lyme disease spirochete.
 Gordon H. Chang, Associate Professor of History, Stanford University: America's relationship with Asia.
 Jay Clayton, Professor of English and Director of Graduate Studies, Vanderbilt University: Contemporary culture and the 19th-century heritage.
 Daniel A. Cohen, Associate Professor of History, Florida International University: Rebecca Reed and the burning of the Charlestown convent.
 Bernard Cooper, Writer, Los Angeles; Member of the Core Faculty in Fiction and Creative Non-Fiction, Antioch University: A memoir.
 Leda Cosmides, Associate Professor of Psychology, University of California, Santa Barbara: Reason and the evolution of the imagination (in collaboration with John Tooby).
 James Cracraft, Professor of History and University Scholar, University of Illinois at Chicago: The Petrine revolution in Russian culture.
 Blondell Cummings, Choreographer and Performer, New York City: Choreography.
 Andrew Cyrille, Composer, Montclair, New Jersey; Member of the Faculty in Music, New School for Social Research: Music composition.
 Frederick T. Davies, Jr., Professor of Horticulture and of Molecular and Environmental Plant Sciences, Texas A&M University: Mycorrhizal fungi as biofertilizers in Peruvian potato farming systems.
 Dick Davis, Professor of Near Eastern Languages and Cultures, Ohio State University: Translation and literary hybridity.
 Robert C. Davis, Associate Professor of History, The Ohio State University: Italian responses to enslavement by Barbary Coast corsairs, 1500-1800.
 Victoria de Grazia, Professor of History, Columbia University: American market culture in 20th-century Europe.
 Percy Alec Deift, Professor of Mathematics, Courant Institute, New York University: Riemann-Hilbert problems in pure and applied mathematics.
 Paul DeMarinis, Artist, San Francisco; Lecturer in Sound Art, San Francisco Art Institute: Sound installation.
 Junot Díaz, Writer, New York City; Assistant Professor of Creative Writing, Syracuse University: Fiction.
 Patsy S. Dickinson, Professor of Biology, Bowdoin College: Long-term control of neural networks and neuronal properties.
 Tamar Diesendruck, Composer, Somerville, Massachusetts; Fellow, Bunting Institute, Radcliffe College: Music composition.
 Marita Dingus, Artist, Auburn, Washington: Sculpture.
 Emmanuel Dongala, Writer, Great Barrington, Massachusetts; Member of the Faculty in Literature and Chemistry, Simon's Rock College of Bard College: Fiction.
 Christopher B. Donnan, Professor of Anthropology, University of California, Los Angeles: Ceramic portraits of ancient Peru.
 Linda Dowling, Independent Scholar, Princeton, New Jersey: Charles Eliot Norton and the art of civil life.
 Laura Lee Downs, Associate Professor of History, University of Michigan: French children's summer camps, 1880-1960.
 Ellen Carol DuBois, Professor of History, University of California, Los Angeles: Women's enfranchisement worldwide.
 Alessandro Duranti, Professor of Anthropology, University of California, Los Angeles: Walter Capps' campaign for the United States Congress.
 Barry Eichengreen, John L. Simpson Professor of Economics and Professor of Political Science, University of California, Berkeley: The European economy since 1945.
 G. Barney Ellison, Professor of Chemistry and Biochemistry, University of Colorado, Boulder: Atmospheric processing of organic aerosols.
 Nader Engheta, Professor of Electrical Engineering, University of Pennsylvania: Fractional paradigm of classical electrodynamics.
 Will Eno, Playwright, Brooklyn, New York: Play writing.
 Eve Ensler, Playwright, New York City: Play writing.
 Kathleen M. Erndle, Associate Professor of Religion, Florida State University: Women, goddess possession, and power in Kangra Hinduism.
 Jason Eskenazi, Photographer, Bayside, New York: Photography.
 Andrew G. Ewing, Professor of Chemistry, J. Lloyd Huck Professor in Natural Sciences, and Adjunct Professor of Neuroscience and Anatomy, Pennsylvania State University: Single-cell membrane structure following exocytosis.
 Carole Fabricant, Professor of English, University of California, Riverside: Anglo-Irish representations of colonial Ireland.
 B. H. Fairchild, Poet, Claremont, California; Professor of English, California State University, San Bernardino: Poetry.
 Aaron L. Fogelson, Professor of Mathematics, University of Utah: The processes of platelet aggregation and coagulation.
 John Foran, Professor of Sociology, University of California, Santa Barbara: The origins of Third World social revolutions.
 David Frick, Professor of Slavic Languages and Literatures, University of California, Berkeley: Peoples, confessions, and languages in 17th-century Vilnius.
 Peter Fritzsche, Professor of History, University of Illinois at Urbana-Champaign: Nostalgia and memory.
 Kit Galloway, Video Artist, Santa Monica, California; Co-Director, Electronic Cafe International, Santa Monica: Video (in collaboration with Sherrie Rabinowitz).
 Andrew Garrison, Film Maker, Louisville, Kentucky; Visiting Lecturer in Film, University of Texas at Austin: Film making.
 Daniel Gilbert, Professor of Psychology, Harvard University: The psychology of affective forecasting.
 Scott F. Gilbert, Professor of Biology, Swarthmore College: The development and evolution of turtle shells.
 Glenda Elizabeth Gilmore, Associate Professor of History, Yale University: Americans and race from World War I to the Brown decision.
 Warren Ginsberg, Professor of English, University at Albany, State University of New York: Chaucer's Italian tradition.
 Robb W. Glenny, Associate Professor of Medicine and of Physiology and Biophysics, University of Washington School of Medicine: Efficient pulmonary gas exchange.
 Lydia Goehr, Professor of Philosophy, Columbia University: The concept of musicality in modernist opera.
 David Goldes, Photographer, Minneapolis; Professor of Media Arts, Minneapolis College of Art and Design: Photography.
 Cameron Gordon, Sid W. Richardson Foundation Regents Professor of Mathematics, University of Texas at Austin: Studies in three-dimensional manifolds.
 Kenneth R. Graves, Photographer, State College, Pennsylvania; Professor of Art, Pennsylvania State University: Photography.
 James E. Haber, Professor of Biology, Brandeis University: The mechanisms of recombination and DNA repair.
 Matt Harle, Artist, Brooklyn, New York: Sculpture.
 Neil Harris, Preston and Sterling Morton Professor of History, University of Chicago: A history of the American urban newspaper building.
 Jeffrey W. Harrison, Poet, Andover, Massachusetts; Roger Murray Writer-in-Residence, Phillips Academy, Andover: Poetry.
 Regina Harrison, Professor of Comparative Literature and Spanish and Director, Comparative Literature Program, University of Maryland, College Park: Cultural translation in colonial Spanish-Quechua literature.
 Kathryn Hellerstein, Lecturer in Yiddish Language and Literature, University of Pennsylvania: Women poets in Yiddish.
 Paul Hendrickson, Staff Writer, The Washington Post; Visiting Lecturer in English, University of Pennsylvania: The legacy of racism in Mississippi sheriffs' families.
 Michael Herzfeld, Professor of Anthropology, Harvard University: Past and present in modern Rome.
 Julia Heyward, Multi-media Artist, New York City; Visiting Instructor in Video Production, Pratt Institute: Multi-media art.
 Tin-Lun Ho, Professor of Physics, Ohio State University: The new physics of quantum gases of alkali atoms.
 Robert Hooper, Artist, Kildeer, Illinois: Painting.
 Jean E. Howard, Professor of English and Director, Institute for Research on Women and Gender, Columbia University: The social role of the London commercial theater in the early 17th century.
 Terence T. L. Hwa, Associate Professor of Physics, University of California, San Diego: Statistical mechanics of biopolymer association.
 Tina L. Ingraham, Artist, Brunswick, Maine: Painting.
 Mikhail Iossel, Writer, Schenectady, New York; Writer-in-Residence, Union College: Fiction.
 Robert Grant Irving, Independent Scholar, West Hartford, Connecticut; Associate Fellow, Berkeley College, Yale University: A life of Sir Herbert Baker, architect.
 Peter Iverson, Professor of History, Arizona State University: A history of the Navajos.
 David Jablonski, Professor of Geophysical Sciences, University of Chicago: A synthetic study of macroevolution.
 Ron Jenkins, Professor of Performing Arts, Emerson College: The theatrical artistry of Dario Fo.
 Ha Jin, Writer, Lawrenceville, Georgia; Associate Professor of English, Emory University: Fiction.
 Caroline A. Jones, Associate Professor of Art History, Boston University: Clement Greenberg and American art.
 William E. Jones, Film Maker, Los Angeles; Member of the Faculty, California Institute of the Arts: Film making.
 Shirley Kaneda, Artist, New York City: Painting.
 Leo Katz, Professor of Law, University of Pennsylvania Law School: The perverse logic of law and morality.
 Carol Keller, Artist, Boston, Massachusetts; Assistant Professor of Art, Boston University: Visual art.
 Jeffrey Knapp, Associate Professor of English, University of California, Berkeley: Church, nation, and theater in Renaissance England.
 Paul Koonce, Composer, Princeton, New Jersey; Assistant Professor of Music, Princeton University: Music composition.
 Carol Lansing, Professor of History, University of California, Santa Barbara: The popolo minuto in medieval Bologna.
 Liz Larner, Artist, Los Angeles; Member of the MFA Faculty, Art Center College of Design, Pasadena: Sculpture.
 James M. Lattimer, Professor of Physics and Astronomy, State University of New York at Stony Brook: The equation of state and neutrino opacities in dense matter.
 Tanya Leullieux (La Tania), Choreographer, Willits, California; Artistic Director, Choreographer, and Dancer, La Tania Flamenco Music and Dance: Choreography.
 Yanguang Li, Assistant Professor of Mathematics, University of Missouri; American Mathematical Society Centennial Fellow, Institute for Advanced Study, Princeton: Chaos in partial differential equations.
 Ken Lum, Artist, Vancouver, Canada; Professor of Fine Arts, University of British Columbia: Visual art.
 Joseph H. Lynch, Professor of History, Ohio State University: Deathbed conversion to the monastic life, 850-1250.
 Sabine G. MacCormack, Mary Ann and Charles R. Walgreen, Jr., Professor for the Study of Human Understanding, Professor of Classical Studies, and Professor of History, University of Michigan: Historical writing in Spain and Peru, 1500-1650.
 Ivan G. Marcus, Frederick P. Rose Professor of Jewish History, Professor of History, and of Religious Studies, Yale University: The relationship of medieval Jews and Christians.
 Ingram Marshall, Composer, Hamden, Connecticut: Music composition.
 Emily Martin, Professor of Anthropology, Princeton University: A cultural analysis of mental terrain in the United States.
 Lisa L. Martin, Professor of Government, Harvard University: Institutional effects on state behavior.
 John Mason, Director, Yoruba Theological Archministry, Brooklyn, New York: Memorial wall-paintings for misspent inner city youth.
 Sara F. Matthews Grieco, Professor of History and Coordinator, Women's and Gender Studies, Syracuse University in Florence, Italy: Printed pictures and the construction of identity in Italy, 1450-1650.
 Peter I. Mészáros, Professor of Astronomy and Astrophysics, Pennsylvania State University: Gamma-ray bursts and their afterglows.
 Linne R. Mooney, Associate Professor of English, University of Maine: Professional scribes in medieval England.
 Ketan Mulmuley, Professor of Computer Science, University of Chicago: Studies in geometric complexity theory.
 Robert S. Nelson, Professor of Art History, University of Chicago: Hagia Sophia as medieval church and modern monument.
 Richard G. Newhauser, Professor of English and Medieval Studies, Trinity University, San Antonio, Texas: The sin of avarice in medieval and Renaissance thought.
 William Royall Newman, Professor of History and Philosophy of Science, Indiana University: Daniel Sennert and early modern matter-theory.
 Josip Novakovich, Writer, Cincinnati, Ohio; Associate Professor of English and Comparative Literature, University of Cincinnati: Fiction.
 Stephen Nowicki, Anne T. and Robert M. Bass Associate Professor of Zoology, Duke University: Nutrition and song-learning in birds.
 Geoffrey O'Brien, Writer, New York City; Editor-in-Chief, Library of America, New York City: Popular music in 20th-century American life.
 Alex O'Neal, Artist, Brooklyn, New York: Painting.
 Steve Orlen, Poet, Tucson, Arizona; Professor of English, University of Arizona; Member of the Faculty, Warren Wilson College MFA Program for Writers: Poetry.
 Katharine Park, Samuel Zemurray, Jr. and Doris Zemurray Stone-Radcliffe Professor of the History of Science and Women's Studies, Harvard University: The early history of human dissection.
 Robert ParkeHarrison, Photographer, Worcester, Massachusetts; Assistant Professor of Art, College of the Holy Cross: Photography.
 Pat Passlof, Artist, New York City; Professor of Art, College of Staten Island, City University of New York: Painting.
 Leighton Pierce, Film Maker, Iowa City; Professor of Film and Video Production, University of Iowa: Film making.
 Claudia Roth Pierpont, Writer, New York City; Contributor, The New Yorker: A biography of Lincoln Kirstein.
 David J. Pine, Professor of Chemical Engineering and Professor of Materials, University of California, Santa Barbara: The dynamics of mesoscopic glassy materials.
 Russell Pinkston, Composer, Austin, Texas; Associate Professor of Composition and Director, Electronic Music Studios, University of Texas at Austin: Music composition.
 Melissa Ann Pinney, Photographer, Evanston, Illinois; Adjunct Instructor in Photography, Columbia College Chicago: Photography.
 Robert A. Pollak, Hernreich Distinguished Professor of Economics, College of Arts and Sciences and the John M. Olin School of Business, Washington University in St. Louis: Family bargaining.
 Sherrie Rabinowitz, Video Artist, Santa Monica, California; Co-Director, Electronic Cafe International, Santa Monica: Video (in collaboration with Kit Galloway).
 Peter Railton, Professor of Philosophy, University of Michigan: Objectivity and value.
 Archie Rand, Artist, Brooklyn, New York; Professor of Visual Arts and Director of Painting and Drawing, Columbia University: Painting.
 Susan Rethorst, Choreographer, Amsterdam, the Netherlands; Instructor in Choreography, Amsterdam School of the Arts: Choreography.
 Michael Riordan, Assistant to the Director, Stanford Linear Accelerator Center, California; Adjunct Professor of Physics, University of California, Santa Cruz: The rise and fall of the Superconducting Super Collider.
 Tyson R. Roberts, Research Associate, Smithsonian Tropical Research Institute(STRI), Panama, and Biodiversity Research and Training Program(BRTP), National Center for Genetic Engineering and Biotechnology, Bangkok, Thailand: Freshwater fishes of tropical Asia.
 Hanneline G. Rogeberg, Artist, Hoboken, New Jersey; Assistant Professor of Painting, Mason Gross School of the Arts, Rutgers University: Painting.
 Peter A. Rogerson, Professor of Geography, University at Buffalo, State University of New York: Statistical methods for the surveillance of geographic patterns.
 Kurt Rohde, Composer, San Francisco; Artistic Director, Chamber Music Partnership, San Francisco: Music composition.
 Pam Ronald, Associate Professor of Plant Pathology, University of California, Davis: Bacterial factors affecting plant host signal transduction.
 Kristin Ross, Professor of Comparative Literature, New York University: French cultural memory and the May 1968 upheavals.
 Ira Sadoff, Poet, Hallowell, Maine; Dana Professor of Poetry, Colby College: Poetry.
 Roberto H. Schonmann, Professor of Mathematics, University of California, Los Angeles: Percolation and related processes on graphs.
 Seth Schwartz, Associate Professor of History, Jewish Theological Seminary: Imperialism and Jewish society, 200 BCE - 634 CE.
 Carol Shields, Writer, Winnipeg, Canada; Chancellor, University of Winnipeg; Professor of English, University of Manitoba: Fiction.
 Uri Shulevitz, Artist and Writer, New York City: Sephardic folktales for young readers.
 Montgomery Slatkin, Professor of Integrative Biology, University of California, Berkeley: Population genetics of human genetic diseases.
 Steven B. Smith, Photographer, Providence, Rhode Island; Adjunct Professor of Photography, Rhode Island School of Design: Photography.
 C. Christopher Soufas, Jr., Professor of Spanish, Tulane University: Spanish literature in modernist Europe.
 Joel Spruck, Professor of Mathematics, Johns Hopkins University: Nonlinear problems in geometry.
 Richard Stamelman, Professor of Romance Languages and Literatures, Williams College: The literature and culture of perfume.
 Duncan G. Steel, Professor of Electrical Engineering and Computer Science, and Professor of Physics, University of Michigan: Semiconductor nanostructures for quantum information.
 Christopher Sullivan, Film Animator, Chicago; Associate Professor of Film Making, School of the Art Institute of Chicago: Film animation.
 Katherine H. Tachau, Professor of History, University of Iowa: The creation of the Bibles moralisées in 13th-century Paris.
 Éva Tardos, Professor of Computer Science, Cornell University: Approximation-algorithms for network problems.
 Maria Tatar, Professor of German, Harvard University: "Bluebeard" in folklore, fiction, and film noir.
 Roger Tibbetts, Artist, Dayville, Connecticut; Associate Professor of Painting, Massachusetts College of Art: Painting and sculpture.
 John Tooby, Professor of Anthropology, University of California, Santa Barbara: Reason and the evolution of the imagination (in collaboration with Leda Cosmides).
 Alan M. Wald, Professor of English and American Culture, University of Michigan: The American literary left in the mid-20th century.
 Mack Walker, Professor of History, Johns Hopkins University: The Halle enlightenment, 1685-1725.
 Alice Wexler, Research Scholar, Center for the Study of Women, University of California, Los Angeles: Chorea and community in East Hampton, New York.
 Susan Wheeler, Poet, New York City; Member of the MFA Faculty in Creative Writing, New School for Social Research: Poetry.
 Brian White, Professor of Mathematics, Stanford University: Minimal surfaces and mean-curvature flow.
 Bruce Winstein, Samuel K. Allison Distinguished Service Professor of Physics, University of Chicago: Polarization measurement of cosmic microwave background radiation.
 Brian Wood, Photographer and Artist, New York City; Lecturer in Photography, Yale University: Photography and graphic art.
 Martha Woodmansee, Professor of English, Case Western Reserve University: Germany's contribution to the Western concept of intellectual property.
 Randall Woolf, Composer, Brooklyn, New York: Music composition.
 James D. Wuest, Professor of Chemistry, University of Montreal: Molecular tectonics.
 Wu Hung, Harrie A. Vanderstappen Distinguished Service Professor of Art History, University of Chicago: Ruins in Chinese visual culture.
 Andrei Y. Yakovlev, Professor and Director of Biostatistics, Huntsman Cancer Institute, University of Utah: Oligodendrocyte development in cell culture.
 Reginald Yates, Choreographer, Tampa, Florida; Artist-in-Residence, Juilliard School: Choreography.
 Eric Zencey, Writer, East Calais, Vermont: The Wollemi pines.
 Xin Zhou, Associate Professor of Mathematics, Duke University: Oscillatory Riemann-Hilbert problems.

Latin American and Caribbean Fellows
 Carlos Aguirre, Assistant Professor of Latin American History, University of Oregon: A social, political, and cultural history of imprisonment in modern Peru.
 Alfredo Benavidez Bedoya, Artist, Buenos Aires, Argentina; Rector, High School of Fine Arts 'Ernesto de la Cárcova', Buenos Aires: Graphic art.
 Esteban Buch, Writer and Musicologist, Paris, France: Opera, zoophilia, and dictatorship.
 Gloria Camiruaga, Video Artist, Santiago, Chile: Film making.
 Marisa Carrasco, Associate Professor of Psychology and Neural Sciences, New York University: Effects of spatial attention on visual perception.
 María C. Chavarría, Assistant Professor of Spanish, Indiana University-Purdue University Indianapolis: Ethnolinguistic dictionary of Ese eja and Spanish.
 Gabri Christa, Choreographer, Staten Island, New York and Curaçao; Artistic Director, CREATE!, Il Piccolo Teatro, Brooklyn, New York: Choreography.
 Hildegardo Córdova Aguilar, Professor of Geography and Executive Director, Research Center for Applied Geography (CIGA), Pontifical Catholic University of Peru, Lima: The environmental sustainability of medium-sized cities in Peru.
 René Davids, Associate Professor of Architecture, University of California, Berkeley: The hillside elevator as a generator of social and urban form in Valparaíso.
 Roberto Escudero, Professor of Physics, Institute of Materials Research, National Autonomous University of Mexico (UNAM): Electron tunneling in magnetic systems.
 Jorge Febles Dueñas, Research Professor, Center for Anthropology, Havana, Cuba: The application of new information and communication technologies to archaeology.
 Pablo A. Ferrari, Professor of Mathematics, University of São Paulo, Brazil: Space-time behavior, quasi-stationarity, and random environment for interacting particle systems.
 Paz Alicia Garciadiego, Screenwriter, Mexico City: Screen writing.
 Roberto Gargarella, Professor of Constitutional Law and Legal Philosophy, Universidad Torcuato di Tella, Buenos Aires, Argentina: The philosophical bases of South American constitutionalism, 1810-1860.
 Jorge Daniel Gelman, Professor of History, University of Buenos Aires, Argentina: The state and the agrarian question in Buenos Aires in the first half of the 19th century.
 Guillermo Giucci, Adjunct Professor of Brazilian Literature, State University of Rio de Janeiro, Brazil: A cultural biography of Gilberto Freyre.
 Flavio Grynszpan, Assistant Professor, The Scripps Research Institute, La Jolla, California: Towards the design and synthesis of artificial enzymes.
 Nibaldo C. Inestrosa, Professor of Molecular Neurobiology, Catholic University of Chile, Santiago: A study of the interaction of cholinesterases with the amyloid-β peptide.
 Leopoldo Infante, Associate Professor of Astrophysics, Catholic University of Chile, Santiago: Formation and evolution of structure in the universe.
 Noemi Lapzeson, Choreographer, Teacher, and Artistic Director, Vertical Danse-Company Noemi Lapzeson, Geneva, Switzerland: Choreography.
 Pedro Lemebel, Writer, Santiago, Chile; Radio Commentator, Radio Tierra Purísima, Santiago: Chronicles of a sinner.
 Enrique P. Lessa, Professor of Evolution, University of the Republic, Montevideo, Uruguay: Geographic genetic structure in the Rio Negro tuco-tuco.
 João Gilberto Noll, Writer, Porto Alegre, Brazil; Columnist, Folha de S.Paulo: Fiction.
 Osvaldo L. Podhajcer, Professor of Biochemistry and Molecular Biology, University of Buenos Aires, Argentina; Head, Gene Therapy Laboratory, Fundacion Campomar, Buenos Aires: Molecular mechanisms associated with human melanoma progression.
 Rosângela Rennó, Artist, Rio de Janeiro, Brazil: Multimedia and installation art.
 Mario Sagradini, Artist, Montevideo, Uruguay: Installation art.
 Arthur Simms, Artist, Long Island City, New York; Preparator, Museum of Modern Art, New York City: Sculpture.
 Heinz R. Sonntag, Professor of Sociology and Senior Researcher, Center for Development Studies, Central University of Venezuela, Caracas: Exclusion, poverty, integration, and cohesion in comparative perspective.
 Javier Téllez, Artist, Long Island City, New York: Installation art.
 Teresa Toledo Cabrera, Independent Researcher and Specialist in Latin American Film Documentation, Madrid, Spain: A dictionary of Latin American film directors.
 Henrique E. Toma, Professor of Chemistry, Institute of Chemistry, University of São Paulo, Brazil: Supramolecular complexes and devices.
 Sergio Vega, Artist, New York City: Installation art.
 Julia Vicioso, Architect, Rome, Italy: The role of the Columbus family palace in the development of colonial Latin American architecture.
 Mariana Villanueva, Composer, Morelos, Mexico: Music composition.

See also
Guggenheim Fellowship

External links
John Simon Guggenheim Memorial Foundation home page

1999
1999 awards